Nipponaphera kastoroae is a species of sea snail, a marine gastropod mollusk in the family Cancellariidae, the nutmeg snails.

Distribution
This marine species occurs off Indonesia.

References

Further reading 
  Verhecken, A. (1997). Mollusca, Gastropoda: Arafura Sea Cancellariidae collected during the KARUBAR Cruise. in: Crosnier, A. et al. (Ed.) Résultats des Campagnes MUSORSTOM 16. Campagne Franco-Indonésienne KARUBAR. Mémoires du Muséum national d'Histoire naturelle. Série A, Zoologie. 172: 295-324.
 Bouchet P. & Petit R. E. (2008). "New species and new records of southwest Pacific Cancellariidae". The Nautilus 122(1): 1-18.

kastoroae
Gastropods described in 1997